What a Woman Dreams of in Springtime (German: Was eine Frau im Frühling träumt) is a 1929 German silent comedy film directed by Curt Blachnitzky and starring Paul Rehkopf, Anna Müller-Lincke and Colette Brettel. The film's art direction was by Kurt Richter.

Cast
 Paul Rehkopf as August Wohlfahrt, Gerichtsvollzieher 
 Anna Müller-Lincke as Amalia Wohlfahrt, seine Frau 
 Colette Brettel as Lotte Wohlfahrt, beider Tochter 
 Kurt Vespermann as Max Müller, Bücherreisender 
 Julius Falkenstein as Josef Columbus, Direktor der Fantasia-Film 
 Colette Darfeuil as Ilona Lundt, seine Stars 
 Ernst Rückert as Peter Alsen, sein Star 
 Ernst Winar as Tom Braun, Film-Regisseur 
 Karl Harbacher   
 Hugo Döblin   
 Ludwig Sachs   
 Heinrich Gotho   
 Harry Grunwald   
 Trude Lehmann   
 Max Maximilian

References

Bibliography
 Prawer, S.S. Between Two Worlds: The Jewish Presence in German and Austrian Film, 1910-1933. Berghahn Books, 2005.

External links

1929 films
1929 comedy films
German comedy films
Films of the Weimar Republic
German silent feature films
German black-and-white films
Silent comedy films
1920s German films
1920s German-language films